Florian Mayer was the defending champion but lost in the quarterfinals to Andreas Haider-Maurer.

Ricardo Ojeda Lara won the title after defeating Haider-Maurer 6–4, 6–3 in the final.

Seeds

Draw

Finals

Top half

Bottom half

References
Main Draw
Qualifying Draw

Bucher Reisen Tennis Grand Prix - Singles
2017 Singles